The 2018 Carlton Football Club season was the Carlton Football Club's 155th season of competition.

It was the club's men's team's 122nd season as a member of the Australian Football League. The team finished last out of eighteen teams in the 2018 AFL season, with the club's worst ever win–loss record of 2–20.

It was the club's women's team's second season as a member of the AFL Women's competition. The team also finished last, out of eight teams, in the 2018 AFL Women's season with a 2–5 record.

The club fielded a team in the VFL Women's competition.

Club summary
The 2018 AFL season was the 122nd season of the VFL/AFL competition since its inception in 1897; and, having competed in every season, it was also the 122nd season contested by the Carlton Football Club. Carlton continued its alignment with the Northern Blues in the Victorian Football League, allowing Carlton-listed players to play with the Northern Blues when not selected in AFL matches. Carlton's primary home ground continued to be the Melbourne Cricket Ground; traditional home ground Ikon Park continued to serve as the training and administrative base. The club fielded its women's team in the second season of the AFL Women's competition, running in February and March; Ikon Park served as the home ground for AFL Women's matches. The club also fielded its VFL women's team in the VFL Women's competition for the first time, splitting home games between RAMS Arena, Craigieburn and Ikon Park.

Car manufacturer Hyundai, which had been a major sponsor of the club continuously since 2008, and airline Virgin Australia, which had upgraded from a secondary sponsor to a major sponsor during the 2017 season, continued as the club's two major sponsors, each signing a five-year extension to their existing deals. In August, the club launched the Carlton College of Sports, a higher education institution in partnership with La Trobe University; it received its first intake of students in 2019 to study sports education diplomas, with much of the program operated out of the redeveloped grandstands at Ikon Park.

Senior Personnel
Mark LoGiudice continued as club president, a role he had held since June 2014. CEO Steven Trigg resigned shortly after the 2017 season, and he was replaced by  Chief Customer Officer Cain Liddle.

Brendon Bolton continued as club coach for his third season in the role. Originally, it was the final season of Bolton's open-ended contract in which he was guaranteed a full payout if sacked; but over the off-season, the club and Bolton renegotiated to extend this period until the end of 2020. The club's coaching staff underwent some changes and expansions before the 2018 season. Director of Coaching Neil Craig retired from the football industry at the end of 2017 after more than four decades as a player and coach; John Barker took over as the club's head of strategy. Recently retired Essendon midfielder Brent Stanton and Geelong Football League coach Jason Davenport both joined the club as development coaches.

Marc Murphy retained his position as club captain for the sixth season. Kade Simpson stepped down as vice-captain after nine years in the role, but remained in the leadership group. Patrick Cripps and Sam Docherty named joint vice captains in his place – Docherty's nomination coming despite having already suffered a season-ending knee injury prior to the announcement. The rest of the extended leadership group comprised Ed Curnow, who held his place in the group from 2017, and Matthew Kreuzer, Lachie Plowman and (despite being on the rookie list) Alex Silvagni, who were all newly elevated, replacing Dennis Armfield and Bryce Gibbs, who both left the club at the end of 2017.

Squad for 2018
The following is Carlton's squad for the 2018 season.

Flags represent the state of origin, i.e. the state in which the player played his Under-18s football.

For players: (c) denotes captain, (vc) denotes vice-captain, (lg) denotes leadership group.
For coaches: (s) denotes senior coach, (cs) denotes caretaker senior coach, (a) denotes assistant coach, (d) denotes development coach, (m) denotes managerial or administrative role in a football or coaching department

Playing list changes
The following summarises all player changes which occurred after the 2017 season. Unless otherwise noted, draft picks refer to selections in the 2017 AFL draft.

As in the 2016/17 offseason, Bryce Gibbs was linked to Adelaide during the trade period. Originally South Australian, Gibbs was three years into a five-year contract, but sought a return to Adelaide for family reasons, nominating the Adelaide Crows as his preferred destination. No deal had been reached during the 2016/17 offseason, but successful negotiations in this offseason saw Gibbs traded to Adelaide for draft picks. Carlton made three recruits during the trade period, and entered the 2017 draft with two selections in the top ten.

In

Out

List management

Season summary

AFLX
Carlton will participate in the inaugural pre-season AFLX competition. The club competed in Pool B at Etihad Stadium on Friday 16 February, playing its round-robin matches against Melbourne and North Melbourne. The club took a young team into the tournament, including several players new to the club in 2018, and Caleb Marchbank served as captain. Carlton lost both of its round robin games and failed to progress to the final.

Pre-season

The club will play two full-length practice matches as part of the JLT Community Series.

Home and away season

Team awards and records
Game records and awards
Round 9 – Carlton's 109-point loss against  was its heaviest ever defeat against that club.
Round 20 – Carlton's 105-point loss against  was its heaviest ever defeat against that club.
Round 23 – Carlton's 104-point loss against  was its heaviest ever defeat against that club.

Season records
Carlton's percentage of 59.29 was its lowest since the 1901 season.
Carlton's total points scored during the season of 1353 was its lowest since 1965, and its lowest ever in a 22-game season.
For the second consecutive year, the club failed to record a score of 100 or higher in any match. 2017 had been the first such season since the 1917 season.
Carlton suffered three losses of 100 or more points in the season, the most ever in the club's history.

Individual awards and records

John Nicholls Medal
The Carlton Football Club Best and Fairest awards night took place on 5 October. The John Nicholls Medal, for the best and fairest player of the club, as well as several other awards, were presented on the night.

John Nicholls Medal
The runaway winner of the John Nicholls Medal was Patrick Cripps, who polled 166 votes to comprehensively beat Kade Simpson, who finished second with 108 votes, and Ed Curnow and Charlie Curnow who tied for third with 98 votes. It was Cripps' second John Nicholls Medal, having first won the medal in 2015.

Other awards
The following other awards were presented on John Nicholls Medal night:-
Best First-Year Player – Paddy Dow
Best Clubman – Matthew Lobbe
Spirit of Carlton Award – Matthew Lobbe
Bill Lanyon Inner Blue Ruthless Award – Patrick Cripps
Carltonians William A. Cook Award – Patrick Cripps

Records
Round 23 – in the match against , Patrick Cripps accumulated 17 clearances, the most ever by a Carlton player, breaking Brett Ratten's twice-achieved 1999 record of 16. This came despite the club's 104-point loss in the game.

Leading goalkickers 
Charlie Curnow was Carlton's leading goalkicker for the season with 34 goals. It was Curnow's first time as Carlton's leading goalkicker.

Other awards
NAB AFL Rising Star
One Carlton player, Paddy Dow was nominated for the 2018 AFL Rising Star award, nominated after his Round 14 performance against . Dow received no votes for the final award.

Honorific teams
All-Australian team – Patrick Cripps was named among the followers in the All-Australian team. No other Carlton players were named in the original 40-man squad.
22under22 team – Charlie Curnow was named at centre half-forward in the 2018 22under22 team for the second consecutive season. Zac Fisher was also selected in the original 40-man squad but did not make the final 22.

AFLPA Awards
For each of the AFLPA awards, one or three Carlton players were nominated by an internal vote of Carlton players; Marc Murphy was also nominated for the Best Captain award by default. Patrick Cripps placed second in the Leigh Matthews Trophy voting for Most Valuable Player, polling 529 votes compared with winner Tom Mitchell's 773. Kade Simpson also placed in the Robert Rose Award for Most Courageous Player, finishing fourth.

Leigh Matthews Trophy (Most Valuable Player)
Patrick Cripps (second place, 529 votes)
Charlie Curnow (nominated)
Kade Simpson (nominated)
Robert Rose Award (Most Courageous Player)
Kade Simpson (fourth place, 73 votes)
Best First Year Player
Paddy Dow (nominated)
Best Captain
Marc Murphy (nominated by default)

AFLCA Awards
Patrick Cripps finished second in the AFL Coaches Association Player of the Year Award with 91 votes, six votes behind winner Max Gawn who polled 97 votes.

Australian Football Hall of Fame
Wayne Johnston was inducted into the Australian Football Hall of Fame during the 2018 season. Johnston played 209 for Carlton from 1979 until 1990, playing in the 1979, 1981, 1982 and 1987 premierships and captaining the club from 1984 to 1985.

Women's teams

AFL Women's
Squad
Key recruitments to the Carlton AFLW squad in the trade period were Brisbane marquee signing Tayla Harris and Collingwood best-and-fairest winner Nicola Stevens. Former first-round draft pick Bianca Jakobsson was traded to Melbourne, and Nat Exon and Bella Ayre were traded to Brisbane. Owing to traded draft picks, Carlton's top selection in the AFLW draft was in the second round (No. 12 overall), used to select Georgia Gee. Altogether, eleven new players joined the Carlton AFLW squad for 2018. Brianna Davey was made captain of the team, having been a vice-captain in its first season; inaugural captain Lauren Arnell became vice-captain alongside Sarah Hosking. Damien Keeping continued as the team's coach for the second season, with assistant coach Nick Rutley also filling in as match day senior coach in two matches when Keeping was absent due to illness.

The following is the final senior squad as announced at the start of the season. Numbers in parentheses represent games played and goals kicked for Carlton in the season. Only supplementary players who played a senior match during the season are listed.

Season summary
The team won its first two matches of the season, before falling dramatically from form to lose its last five games – mostly by wide margins – and finish last in the competition. Part of the club's on-field fall from grace was attributed to the season-ending knee injury suffered by captain Brianna Davey in round two.

Notable events
The second quarter of the Round 2 match against GWS was delayed for thirty minutes by thunderstorms.
The Western Bulldogs' score of 12.14 (86) and winning margin of 73 against Carlton in Round 4 both set records as the highest in AFLW history. These records stood until Round 8, 2021 and Round 8, 2022 respectively.

VFL Women's
Prior to the 2018 season, Carlton was one of six AFL clubs granted a licence in the VFL Women's competition, as part of a significant reconfiguration of that competition which saw all Victorian-based AFL clubs taking a direct or affiliative involvement in a VFLW team. Carlton fielded a women's team, branded as the Carlton Blues, in the VFLW competition from the 2018 season onwards. The team finished 7th out of 13 in the league with a win–loss record of 6–8.

Northern Blues 
The Carlton Football Club had full affiliation with the Northern Blues during the 2018 season. It was be the sixteenth season of the clubs' affiliation, which had been in place since 2003. Carlton senior- and rookie-listed players who were not selected to play in the Carlton team were eligible to play for the Northern Blues senior team in the Victorian Football League. The club's home matches were split between the VFL club's traditional home ground Preston City Oval, and Carlton's traditional home ground Ikon Park. The team finished 12th out of 15 in the 2018 VFL season with a win–loss record of 6–12.SportsTG

References

Carlton Football Club seasons
Carlton
Carlton